Hauturu is a village near the eastern shores of the Kawhia Harbour, in the Otorohanga District and Waikato region of New Zealand's North Island.

The local Rākaunui Marae is a meeting ground for the Ngāti Maniapoto hapū of Kerapa, Takiari and Te Waha, and the Waikato Tainui hapū of Ngāti Ngutu and Ngāti Paretekawa. It includes the Moanakahakore meeting house.

Education

Hauturu School is a Year 1–8 co-educational state primary school. The school, which was also known as Awaroa School, was described as being made of packing cases before it was rebuilt in 1924.

Te Koraha 
A request to extend Hauturu Road up the Awaroa valley was made by the new settlers in 1905. Te Koraha School was open from at least 1911 to 1935. It was about 12km up the Awaroa valley.

References

Ōtorohanga District
Populated places in Waikato